Dan Glading (born December 17, 1986 in Bethesda, Maryland) is a lacrosse player, nicknamed Danny Glading who played at the University of Virginia and currently plays in Major League Lacrosse for the Chesapeake Bayhawks.

Danny Glading played in high school for Georgetown Prep, a school regularly nationally ranked in lacrosse. Glading played attack for the Virginia Cavaliers from 2006 to 2009, leading the team to an NCAA Championship in 2006. He was named an All-American three times by the USILA and was a finalist for the 2009 Tewaaraton Trophy, given annually to the nation's best lacrosse player. Glading finished his career ranked in Virginia's top ten in goals (seventh), assists (tied for fifth), and points (tied for fifth). His career totals of 119 goals and 104 assists make him only the sixth player in Atlantic Coast Conference history to reach 100 goals and 100 assists in a career.

The Washington Bayhawks selected Glading with the fifth overall pick of the 2009 Major League Lacrosse draft.

Statistics

University of Virginia

Major League Lacrosse

References

1986 births
American lacrosse players
Major League Lacrosse players
Virginia Cavaliers men's lacrosse players
Living people